Jerangle is a locality in New South Wales, Australia.

Jerangle has a cemetery, two churches, a school, a Country Women's Association hall and phone box. The main location is the school; Jerangle Public School. This school has had small numbers of students that range from 6 to 20. The school was established as a "house to house" school in 1884, but has operated at a permanent location since 1892, although generally as a "half-time" school until 1923.

References

Towns in New South Wales